George Edward Eastham, OBE (born 23 September 1936) is an English former footballer. He is known for playing for Newcastle United, Arsenal and Stoke City, as well as a member of England's 1966 World Cup-winning squad. However, he is also notable for his involvement in a 1963 court case which proved a landmark in improving players' freedom to move between clubs.

Eastham began his career with Northern Irish side Ards before moving back to England with Newcastle United in 1956. He became a fine inside forward for the "Magpies" but then shocked the club by demanding a move away which Newcastle rejected. Eastham took his case to the courts and won his case moving to Arsenal. Eastham spent six seasons at Highbury making 223 appearances scoring 41 goals for the "Gunners" before joining Stoke City in 1966. His experience helped Stoke enjoy a successful spell in the early 1970s and Eastham scored the winning goal in the 1972 League Cup Final. He also spent time coaching in South Africa playing for Hellenic before returning to Stoke to become assistant manager to Tony Waddington. When Waddington resigned in March 1977 Eastham was appointed manager but was unable to prevent Stoke being relegated in 1976–77 and after failing to mount a promotion challenge the following season Eastham was sacked in January 1978. He then returned to coach in South Africa.

Playing career

Newcastle United
Eastham was part of a footballing family – his father, George Eastham Sr., was an England international who played for Bolton Wanderers and Blackpool, while his uncle Harry Eastham played for Liverpool and Accrington Stanley. In his youth he was a useful cricketer, playing in the same Blackpool CC team as his future fellow international, Jimmy Armfield.

Eastham junior first played for Northern Irish club Ards, where his father was player-manager, and the two played together on the pitch. A skilful midfielder/inside forward, he was signed by Newcastle United in 1956, and made his debut against Luton Town on 6 October 1956, in a match which finished 2–2. He spent four seasons with the Magpies and during his time there he won caps for the Football League and the England U23 side. He played 125 games for Newcastle, scoring 34 goals, their best finish during this time being eighth in 1959–60.

However, during his time at Newcastle United Eastham fell out with the club, with Eastham disputing whether the house the club had supplied him was habitable, the unsatisfactory secondary job that the club had arranged (as maximum wage rules at the time forbade clubs from paying the market rate) and their attempts to stop him playing for the England U23 team. With his contract due to expire soon, in 1959, Eastham refused to sign a new one and requested a transfer. However, Newcastle refused to let Eastham go. At the time, clubs operated a system known as retain-and-transfer, which meant that teams could keep a player's registration (thus preventing them from moving) while refusing to pay them if they had requested a transfer. As Eastham later recounted:

Unable to leave, Eastham went on strike at the end of the 1959–60 season, moving south to work for an old family friend, Ernie Clay (who later became chairman of Fulham), selling cork in Guildford, Surrey, a venture which earned him more money than his Newcastle contract paid. Finally in October 1960 Newcastle relented and sold Eastham to Arsenal for £47,500. However, Eastham considered the point worth fighting for, and backed by the Professional Footballers' Association (who provided £15,000 to pay for Eastham's legal fees), he took the club to the High Court in 1963.

In the case, Eastham v. Newcastle United [1964] Ch. 413, Eastham argued that it was an unfair restraint of trade, and that Newcastle owed him £400 in unpaid wages and £650 in unpaid bonuses. The judge, Mr Justice Wilberforce, ruled partly in Eastham's favour, stating that the retain-and-transfer system was unreasonable, although he ruled that as Eastham had refused to play for Newcastle, that any payment of wages for the disputed period was at Newcastle's discretion. As a result, although Eastham did not gain personally, he succeeded in reforming the British transfer market. The "retain" element of retain-and-transfer was greatly reduced, providing fairer terms for players looking to re-sign for their clubs, and setting up a transfer tribunal for disputes.

Arsenal

Eastham made his Arsenal debut against Bolton Wanderers on 10 December 1960, and scored twice as Arsenal won 5–1. Later on that same season, he scored the equaliser against his former club Newcastle United at St James' Park, in a 3–3 draw, during which he was called "Judas" and pelted with apples. Throughout his six seasons at Arsenal, he was a regular for the side; though not a prolific goalscorer, Eastham was one of the most talented players of what was an average Arsenal side at the time; under George Swindin and Billy Wright, Arsenal never finished higher than 7th during his time there.

Eastham's time at Arsenal was often turbulent; as well as the court case against Newcastle United, he fell out with Arsenal after asking for a pay rise following the maximum wage's abolishment in 1961 (but eventually Arsenal relented and met his demands), and he asked for a transfer after being replaced by Joe Baker up front at the start of the 1962–63 season. However, Billy Wright sought a compromise and eventually restored Eastham to the side, behind Baker; Eastham's form returned, he came off the transfer list and in both 1963–64 and 1964–65 he scored ten goals, the most per season during his Arsenal career, which included two in a 4–4 draw in a memorable North London derby match against Tottenham Hotspur at Highbury in October 1963.

It was at Arsenal that Eastham's international career flourished; he joined the England squad for the 1962 FIFA World Cup as an uncapped player, but did not play in the tournament; his England debut finally came on 8 May 1963, against Brazil. His final game for England came in a warmup game for the 1966 FIFA World Cup, against Denmark in Copenhagen on 3 July 1966, scoring in a 2–0 win. Eastham was also part of the squad for that tournament, but did not play a single minute of England's win in the tournament.

In the 1966 World Cup final only the 11 players on the pitch at the end of the 4–2 win over West Germany received medals. Following a Football Association led campaign to persuade FIFA to award medals to all the winners' squad members, Eastham was presented with his medal by Gordon Brown at a ceremony at 10 Downing Street on 10 June 2009.

Eastham continued to be a regular and served as Arsenal captain between 1963 and 1966, but Arsenal's declining form – finishing 14th in 1965–66 — led to Wright's dismissal in the summer of 1966. By now Eastham was nearly 30, and the new Arsenal management sought to dismantle Wright's side in favour of younger players. He joined Stoke City in August 1966, having scored 41 goals in 223 matches for the Gunners.

Stoke City

Eastham was purchased by Stoke City manager, Tony Waddington, for a fee of £35,000, prior to the start of the 1966–67 season. Eastham spent the next eight seasons at Stoke City, during which the club maintained their status in the First Division. He played in a side which combined home grown talent – such as the likes of Denis Smith, Eric Skeels and Mike Pejic — alongside the experience of veterans like Eastham and Peter Dobing. Stoke won the League Cup in 1971–72, with Eastham scoring the winning goal in the final against Chelsea, which finished 2–1. At the age of 35 years 161 days, he became the oldest player to receive a winner's medal. He was also a beaten FA Cup semi-finalist in successive seasons (1970–71 and 1971–72) — both times in replays and both times by his former club Arsenal. Eastham also represented Stoke at European level, playing in the 1972–73 UEFA Cup; the first time the club had competed at European level in its history. In the first round, Stoke played Kaiserslautern of Germany but lost 5–3 on aggregate over two legs and were knocked out of the competition in the process.

In February 1971, at the age of 34, Eastham took a break from playing to develop his coaching ability, with the view of going into management. He embarked on a trip to South Africa, playing on loan with Cape Town City before having a spell as player-manager of Hellenic, who had previously been managed by his father. Eastham returned to Stoke in October 1971, to continue his playing career.

Eastham made 194 league appearances for Stoke City in total, ten of them as a substitute, scoring four goals. Eastham retired from playing in 1974, having been appointed an OBE for services to football the previous year.

Managerial career
Eastham became Tony Waddington's assistant at Stoke, and succeeded Waddington as Stoke manager after the latter resigned in March 1977, becoming only the club's fourth manager since 1935. He took over a side depleted of their best players who had been sold off to pay for repair work at the Victoria Ground and in trouble, and their relegation from the First Division was confirmed while he was in charge, finishing 21st out of 22 in 1976–77 after a run of just one win in 13 games. Eastham lasted only ten months, leaving the club in January 1978, after failing to sustain a push for promotion from the Second Division.

Retirement
After leaving the Stoke job, he quit professional football completely, and emigrated to South Africa in 1978. He set up his own sportswear business as well as being a football coach for local black children (being a noted opponent of Apartheid). He is also chairman of the South African Arsenal Supporters' Club.

Career statistics

Club

International

Managerial statistics

Honours
Stoke City
Football League Cup: 1971–72

England
World Cup: 1966

Individual
United Soccer Association All-Star Team: 1967
PFA Merit Award 1976
Officer of the Order of the British Empire (OBE): 1973

References

External links

1936 births
Sportspeople from Blackpool
Living people
English footballers
England international footballers
England under-23 international footballers
Association football midfielders
Ards F.C. players
Newcastle United F.C. players
Arsenal F.C. players
Stoke City F.C. players
Cleveland Stokers players
Cape Town City F.C. (NFL) players
Hellenic F.C. players
English Football League players
English Football League representative players
1962 FIFA World Cup players
1966 FIFA World Cup players
FIFA World Cup-winning players
English football managers
Stoke City F.C. managers
English Football League managers
United Soccer Association players
Officers of the Order of the British Empire
People educated at Arnold School
English expatriate footballers
Expatriate soccer players in South Africa
English expatriate sportspeople in the United States
Expatriate soccer players in the United States
National Football League (South Africa) players